Amahl William D'vaz Pellegrino  (born 18 June 1990) is a Norwegian professional footballer who plays as a left winger or forward for Eliteserien club Bodø/Glimt.

Career
Pellegrino started his career in Drammen FK, before moving to Bærum SK at the age of 22. Bærum played in the 2012 Norwegian First Division, was relegated that year, but won promotion again in 2013. In the summer of 2014, Pellegrino signed for top-tier club Lillestrøm SK. He made his league debut for the club in August 2014 against FK Haugesund. Following a tenure completely without league goals, he went on to Mjøndalen IF in the summer of 2015, but the club was relegated the same year. After failing to win promotion with Mjøndalen in 2016 and 2017, he achieved his childhood dream by signing a two-year-contract with his home town Eliteserien club Strømsgodset on 20 November 2017.

After being played mostly on the wing, he failed to succeed in Strømsgodset and was sold to Kristiansund in the 2019 season. There, he prospered with the team, and scored 33 goals in 39 league matches. He was sold to Damac in the Saudi league in 2021, but soon returned to Norway and the highly successful Bodø/Glimt team, in the second half of the 2021 season. There, he found his place in the team, scoring 35 goals in his first 58 matches in all tournaments, including 9 in 21 matches in Europe.

Personal life
Pellegrino was born in Norway to Tanzanian parents.

Career statistics

Honours
Bodø/Glimt
Eliteserien: 2021

Individual
Eliteserien Top scorer: 2022

References

1990 births
Living people
Sportspeople from Drammen
Norwegian footballers
Norwegian people of Tanzanian descent
Association football forwards
Bærum SK players
Lillestrøm SK players
Mjøndalen IF players
Strømsgodset Toppfotball players
Kristiansund BK players
Damac FC players
FK Bodø/Glimt players
Norwegian First Division players
Eliteserien players
Saudi Professional League players
Norwegian expatriate footballers
Expatriate footballers in Saudi Arabia
Norwegian expatriate sportspeople in Saudi Arabia